Alan Robb Boyd is a Canadian former diplomat. He was Representative to the International Civil Aviation Organization.

External links 
 Foreign Affairs and International Trade Canada Complete List of Posts

Canadian diplomats
Year of birth missing (living people)
Living people
Place of birth missing (living people)
International Civil Aviation Organization people